Civil Police Officer (abbreviated CPO) is the lowest rank in the Kerala Police, followed by a Senior Civil Police Officer. A civil police officer in the Kerala Police is equivalent to a police constable in the police forces of other states in India. As compared to other police constables (e.g., armed PCs), the civil police officer is allotted to the Kerala civil police cadre. A civil police officer has no shoulder insignia, while a Senior Civil Police Officer has three stripes or chevrons. More than half of the force is made up of civil police officers. They work in police stations, traffic police units, and other local police units in Kerala. The nomenclature of Police Constable was changed to Civil Police Officer (CPO) in Kerala Police in 2011 during the tenure of Kodiyeri Balakrishnan as the Home Minister of Kerala. The change in nomenclature was part of a broader initiative to modernize and professionalize the police force in Kerala. Civil Police Officers play a crucial role in maintaining law and order in Kerala. They are the backbone of the police force and work tirelessly to ensure the safety and security of the public.

Uniform and insignia 
Officers of the rank of Civil Police Officer wear a yellow lanyard on the top of the shirt and a cap with an Ashoka Chakra on dark blue with a yellow ribbon. The baton (Llathi) is the personal weapon of the CPOs.

Recruitment and training 
To become a Civil Police Officer in the Kerala Police, candidates must have a minimum educational qualification of 12th standard or equivalent. They must also meet certain physical standards and pass a series of tests, including a written examination, physical fitness test, and medical examination conducted by the Kerala Public Service Commission. Candidates who wish to become Civil Police Officers in Kerala Police must have a minimum educational qualification of a higher secondary education (12th grade). They must also meet other physical and medical standards set by the police department.

The recruitment process involves a written examination, physical efficiency test, and medical examination. Successful candidates then undergo training at the Kerala Police Academy, where they are trained in various aspects of policing, such as law, investigation, and physical fitness.

Once recruited, Civil Police Officers undergo training at the Kerala Police Academy, which is located in Thrissur. The training covers various aspects of policing, including criminal law, investigation techniques, public relations, and human rights. The training also includes physical fitness training, weapon handling, and drill exercises.

References

Law enforcement in India
Kerala Police